The National Archery Association of Thailand (NAAT) is the national governing body for Archery. It is accredited by the World Archery Federation (WA) which is the governing body for the sport of Archery in the world, and the National Olympic Committee of Thailand (NOCT). It founded on 10 November 1970.  

The association is headquartered in Bang Kapi, Bangkok. The current head of the federation is Mr. Sanguan Kosavinta.

Championships
National Archery Association of Thailand organises championships every year in each of the sporting disciplines.

External links
National Archery Association of Thailand  

Thailand
Thailand
Archery in Thailand
Archery
Sports organizations established in 1970
1970 establishments in Thailand